Stjórnin is an Icelandic music duo composed of singers Grétar Örvarsson, born 11 July 1959, and Sigríður Beinteinsdóttir, born 24 July 1962. Together they represented Iceland at the Eurovision Song Contest 1990 held in Zagreb. Their entry, "Eitt lag enn" was placed fourth out of 22 songs. Both singers were later members of another Eurovision group Heart 2 Heart who represented Iceland in 1992 with the song "Nei eða já". This entry was placed seventh out of 23 in Malmö.

Beinteinsdóttir, under the stage name Sigga, made a third Eurovision appearance for Iceland, as a soloist, in 1994. Her song "Nætur" was placed 12th out of 25 entries in Dublin.

Eurovision Song Contest entrants for Iceland
Eurovision Song Contest entrants of 1990
Icelandic pop music groups